Logan is a city in Logan County, West Virginia, United States, along the Guyandotte River. The population was 1,438 at the 2020 census. It is the county seat of Logan County.

History
What is now Logan was initially called "Islands of the Guyandot" by explorers who identified the site in the 1780s.  In 1827, a town was laid out at the site to serve as a county seat for Logan County, which had been established in 1824.  The city was initially known as "Lawsonsville" after Anthony Lawson, an early merchant, but was shortened to "Lawnsville." In the early 1850s, Thomas Dunn English, a poet and future congressman, led efforts to reorganize the town.  When the town incorporated in 1853, it was renamed "Aracoma" after the Shawnee chief Cornstalk's daughter, who had been killed by settlers in the area in 1780.  The city was renamed "Logan" in 1907 after the Mingo leader, Chief Logan.

Logan grew continuously during the late 19th and early 20th centuries as a hub of the regional coal industry.  At its height in 1940, the city had a population of over 5,000, and was home to numerous businesses, including furniture stores, hotels, banks, and car dealerships.  Logan began to decline following World War II, due in large part to the increased mechanization of the coal industry.

The Chafin House, was listed on the National Register of Historic Places in 1994. Logan was home to the Logan Indians, a minor league baseball team, from 1937 to 1942.

Geography
Logan is located at the confluence of the Guyandotte River and Island Creek.

Climate

Demographics

2010 census
As of the census of 2010, there were 1,779 people, 808 households, and 469 families living in the city. The racial makeup of the city was 91.6% White, 5.2% African American, 0.3% Native American, 0.7% Asian, 0.2% from other races, and 2.0% from two or more races. Hispanic or Latino of any race were 2.0% of the population.

There were 808 households, of which 26.4% had children under the age of 18 living with them, 36.8% were married couples living together, 15.7% had a female householder with no husband present, 5.6% had a male householder with no wife present, and 42.0% were non-families. 37.0% of all households were made up of individuals, and 13.6% had someone living alone who was 65 years of age or older. The average household size was 2.20 and the average family size was 2.85.

The median age in the city was 40.4 years. 20.2% of residents were under the age of 18; 9.4% were between the ages of 18 and 24; 26.3% were from 25 to 44; 28.1% were from 45 to 64; and 15.8% were 65 years of age or older. The gender makeup of the city was 47.4% male and 52.6% female.

2000 census
As of the census of 2000, there were 1,630 people, 750 households, and 423 families living in the city. The population density was 1,403.5 people per square mile (542.5/km2). There were 965 housing units at an average density of 830.9 per square mile (321.2/km2). The racial makeup of the city was 92.52% White, 4.79% African American, 0.31% Native American, 0.61% Asian, 0.06% from other races, and 1.72% from two or more races. Hispanic or Latino of any race were 0.80% of the population.

There were 750 households, out of which 20.9% had children under the age of 18 living with them, 38.3% were married couples living together, 13.2% had a female householder with no husband present, and 43.6% were non-families. 40.7% of all households were made up of individuals, and 18.9% had someone living alone who was 65 years of age or older. The average household size was 2.08 and the average family size was 2.78.

In the city, the population was spread out, with 16.8% under the age of 18, 8.5% from 18 to 24, 26.2% from 25 to 44, 26.7% from 45 to 64, and 21.8% who were 65 years of age or older. The median age was 44 years. For every 100 females, there were 82.3 males. For every 100 females age 18 and over, there were 79.1 males.

The median income for a household in the city was $22,623, and the median income for a family was $26,354. Males had a median income of $26,350 versus $19,167 for females. The per capita income for the city was $15,913. About 18.2% of families and 20.7% of the population were below the poverty line, including 29.0% of those under age 18 and 9.7% of those age 65 or over.

Education
Logan is served by Logan High School, grades 9-12.

Media 
 The Logan Banner is published each Wednesday.
 WVOW, a local ABC radio affiliate.

Notable people

 Michael Ammar, magician
 Shane Burton, retired defensive tackle for four NFL teams
 Don Chafin, sheriff of Logan County during the "armed march" or Battle of Blair Mountain
 Jack Dempsey, heavyweight boxing champion
 Thomas Dunn English, mayor and poet
 Joanne Dru, film and television actress
 Jack Harris, radio and television broadcast personality
 Devil Anse Hatfield, patriarch of the Hatfield family during the famous Hatfield & McCoy feud
 Frankie Zoly Molnar, recipient of Congressional Medal of Honor for his actions in the Vietnam War
 Landau Eugene Murphy Jr., traditional pop singer and winner in the sixth season of America's Got Talent
 Richard Ojeda, West Virginia state senator representing the 7th district
 Lea Ann Parsley, Winter Olympics skeleton racing silver medalist
 Mamie Thurman, murder victim

See also
Political scandals in Logan County, West Virginia

References

External links

Logan, WV History and Nostalgia

Cities in Logan County, West Virginia
County seats in West Virginia
Logan Coalfield
Populated places on the Guyandotte River
Cities in West Virginia